The Willow Tree Triptych is a limited edition EP by Rasputina, of 100 units which were released in 2009. The album contains 3 different songs from 3 countries, all titled "The Willow Tree", in American, English, Irish. The album also features individual hand-numbered and hand-collaged covers by Melora & Hollis so each CD packaging is unique.

Track listing

Album details
Original Release Date: 2009
Label: none
Recording Mode: Stereo
Recording Type: Studio
Producer: Melora Creager
Distributor: self-distributed
Rasputina: Melora Creager (cello, vocals)
Additional Personnel: Hollis Lane Creager (album artwork).

References

2009 EPs
Rasputina (band) albums